The 1954 PGA Championship was the 36th PGA Championship, held July 21–27 at Keller Golf Club in Maplewood, Minnesota, a suburb north of St. Paul.  Chick Harbert won the match play championship, 4 & 3 over defending champion Walter Burkemo in the Tuesday final; the winner's share was $5,000 and the runner-up's was $3,000.

It marked the second time the PGA Championship returned to a venue; public Keller had also hosted in 1932; Oakmont near Pittsburgh hosted in 1922 and 1951. It was the third and last final for the two finalists, both from the Detroit area; each had one victory and two losses. Harbert lost in 1947 and 1952, while Burkemo lost in 1951 and won in 1953.

In the finals, Burkemo eagled the first hole and was three up after four holes, but soon cooled off; the match was even on the twelfth tee and Harbert led by one at the lunch break. The afternoon round was bogey-free for both, but Harbert had five birdies to Burkemo's two and the match ended on the 33rd green.

Ed "Porky" Oliver won $250 as the medalist in the stroke-play qualifying with a 136 (−6); he fell 3 & 1 in the third round to eventual champion Harbert.

Format
The match play format at the PGA Championship in 1954 called for 12 rounds (216 holes) in seven days:
 Wednesday and Thursday – 36-hole stroke play qualifier, 18 holes per day;
the defending champion Walter Burkemo and top 63 professionals advanced to match play
 Friday – first two rounds, 18 holes each
 Saturday – third round – 36 holes
 Sunday – quarterfinals – 36 holes
 Monday – semifinals – 36 holes
 Tuesday – final – 36 holes

Past champions in the field

Failed to qualify

Source:

Final results
Tuesday, July 27, 1954

Final eight bracket

Final match scorecards
Morning

^ = picked up ball (hole concession)

Afternoon

Source:

References

External links
PGA Media Guide 2012
PGA.com – 1954 PGA Championship

PGA Championship
Golf in Minnesota
Sports in Minneapolis–Saint Paul
PGA Championship
PGA Championship
PGA Championship
PGA Championship